Trigodon is an extinct genus of the family Toxodontidae, a large bodied notoungulate which inhabited South America during the Late Miocene to Early Pliocene (Mayoan to Montehermosan in the SALMA classification), living from 11.61 to 4.0 Ma and existed for approximately . The type species is T. gaudryi.

It bore a superficial resemblance to a rhinoceros, in that it had a horn on its forehead.

Fossil distribution 
 Monte Hermoso Formation, Argentina
 Solimões Formation, Acre State, Brazil, eastern slope of Andes Mountains.

References 

Toxodonts
Miocene mammals of South America
Pliocene mammals of South America
Miocene genus first appearances
Pliocene extinctions
Montehermosan
Huayquerian
Chasicoan
Mayoan
Neogene Argentina
Fossils of Argentina
Neogene Brazil
Fossils of Brazil
Fossil taxa described in 1887
Taxa named by Florentino Ameghino
Prehistoric placental genera